Flattery is a 1925 American silent drama film directed by Tom Forman and starring John Bowers, Marguerite De La Motte, and Alan Hale.

Plot
As described in a review in a film magazine, Reginald Mallory (Bowers) has been susceptible to flattery since youth. Politicians make him city engineer so that they may have a “goat,” and he is wheedled into signing a contract without reading it. All lose faith in Mallory except Betty Biddle (De La Motte), his sweetheart, daughter of the president of a construction company. Mallory apparently plays the game and turns crooked, but in the end it is discovered that he has been obtaining evidence against the crooks.

Cast

Preservation
With no prints of Flattery located in any film archives, it is a lost film.

References

Bibliography
 Munden, Kenneth White. The American Film Institute Catalog of Motion Pictures Produced in the United States, Part 1. University of California Press, 1997.

External links

1925 films
1925 drama films
1920s English-language films
American silent feature films
Silent American drama films
Films directed by Tom Forman
American black-and-white films
1920s American films